Sports in West Bengal has its own importance. Cricket and football are the most popular sports in the Indian state of West Bengal.

Football 
Unlike in other Indian states where cricket is considered as the most popular game with some exceptions, football is the most popular game in West Bengal. It can be considered as the football hub of India and houses many clubs like Mohun Bagan,  East Bengal Club, Mohammedan Sporting Club.

Cricket 
As mostly in India, cricket is immensely popular among the masses of west Bengal. It houses the Eden Gardens stadium  which is the largest cricket stadium in India. Eden gardens can house more than 100,000 people and is one of the only two 100,000-seat cricket amphitheaters in the world. Eden gardens is also the home for the East Zone and Bengal Cricket team. It also houses the Indian Premier League team Kolkata Knight Riders bought by Shah Rukh Khan which uses Eden gardens as its home turf.  Calcutta Cricket and Football Club is the second-oldest cricket club in the world.

Other games 
Indian sports like kho kho and kabaddi are also popular among the masses here.

Polo 
The oldest polo club of the world, Calcutta Polo Club is also present here.

Golf 
Outside Great Britain the Royal Calcutta Golf Club is the oldest of its kind.

Stadiums 
 Eden Gardens is used mainly for cricket.
 Vivekananda Yuba Bharati Krirangan, a multi-use stadium, is the world's second highest-capacity football stadium.
 Durgapur, Siliguri and Kharagpur also hold various national and international sports events.

Notable persons 
 Dola Banerjee - archer
 P.K. Banerjee - footballer
 Rahul Banerjee - archer
 Swapna Barman - gold medal winner of heptathlon in 2018 Asian Games in Jakarta, Indonesia
 Dibyendu Barua - chess grand master
 Sourav Ganguly - former Indian national cricket captain
 Chuni Goswami - footballer
 Sailen Manna - footballer
 Leander Paes - Olympic tennis bronze medallist
 Pankaj Roy - former Indian cricketer
 Wriddhiman Saha - Indian cricketer 
 Mihir Sen - swimmer
 Jyotirmoyee Sikdar - athlete and winner of gold medals at the Asian Games
 Manoj Tiwary - Indian cricketer
 Jhulan Goswami - former captain of India national women's cricket team
 Sukalyan Ghosh Dastidar - former Indian national team footballer

References

Sport in West Bengal